Robert MacKenzie or similar may refer to:

Entertainers 
Bob McKenzie (actor) (1880–1949), 1940s film actor
Bob McKenzie (broadcaster) (born 1956), Canadian ice hockey broadcaster
Bob McKenzie (active since 1980), fictional character from the Bob and Doug McKenzie comedy skit
Robert Mackenzie, actor in the film The Woman Eater (1957)

Politicians 
Sir Robert Mackenzie, 10th Baronet (1811–1873), premier of Queensland, Australia
Robert McKenzie (Australian politician) (1865–1928), MP and government minister in Western Australia
Robert McKenzie (Canadian politician) (1875–1942), Liberal party member of the Canadian House of Commons
Robert W. Mackenzie (1928–2011), Canadian politician, cabinet minister
Bobby McKenzie, unsuccessful candidate in United States House of Representatives elections in Michigan, 2014

Sportsmen 
Sir Robert Campbell MacKenzie (1856–1945), British Army officer and Scottish international rugby union player
Robert Lee McKenzie (1870–1956), American politician, first mayor of Panama City, Florida
Robert Mackenzie (cricketer) (1886–1934), English cricketer
Bob McKenzie (footballer) (1928–2012), Australian rules football player for Melbourne
Robert McKenzie (footballer, born 1950), Australian rules football player for Melbourne
Robert McKenzie (rugby player) (1869–1940), New Zealand rugby union player
Robert McKenzie (Scottish footballer), Scottish footballer
Robert MacKenzie (darts player), Scottish former darts player

Others 
Robert Mackenzie (trader) (fl. 1836–1853), Scottish-born businessman
Robert Mackenzie Johnston (1843–1918), Scottish-Australian statistician and man of science
R. Tait McKenzie (1867–1938), Canadian-born American surgeon and sculptor
Robert McKenzie (aviator) (1895–1945), Australian World War I flying ace
Robert McKenzie (psephologist) (1917–1981), Canadian academic & statistical analyst of elections
Robert C. MacKenzie (1948–1995), American professional soldier noteworthy for service in the Rhodesian SAS
Robert Mackenzie (sound engineer), Australian sound engineer
Bob Mackenzie (businessman) (born 1952), British businessman
Robert L. McKenzie, American domestic and foreign policy analyst
Robert Cameron Mackenzie (1920–2000), Scottish thermoanalyst and clay mineralogist